The Eleven Schill Officers is a 1932 German historical film directed by Rudolf Meinert and starring Friedrich Kayßler, Hertha Thiele, and Heinz Klingenberg. It was a remake of a 1926 silent film of the same name which had also been directed by Meinert. The film depicts the failed 1809 uprising of Prussian soldiers led by Ferdinand von Schill against the occupying French. It focuses in particular on eleven of Schill's officers who were executed by the French at Wesel. The film was a Prussian film, part of a wider trend of German historical films made during the Weimar Era and set in the Napoleonic Era.

It was shot at the Johannisthal Studios in Berlin and on location in Stralsund on the Baltic. The film's sets were designed by the art director Heinrich Richter.

Main cast

References

Bibliography

External links

1932 films
Films of the Weimar Republic
German historical films
German war drama films
1930s German-language films
Films directed by Rudolf Meinert
Films set in 1809
Napoleonic Wars films
War films based on actual events
Prussian films
1930s historical films
Remakes of German films
Sound film remakes of silent films
German black-and-white films
Films shot at Johannisthal Studios
1930s German films